Riegersburg is a municipality in the district of Südoststeiermark in the Austrian state of Styria. Riegersburg Castle is situated on a hill above the town.

Population

References

Cities and towns in Südoststeiermark District